The Bristol Pullman was a British prototype passenger aircraft developed from the Braemar triplane heavy bomber.

Design and development
The Pullman was developed as a 14-passenger variant of the Braemar bomber. The third prototype Braemar was completed as the prototype and sole Pullman and first flew early in May 1920. It was shown at the International Aero Show at Olympia in July of that year, where its great size and interior fittings were much admired. The Pullman was one of the earliest British aircraft to have a fully enclosed crew cabin, and this feature was disliked by service pilots, who often carried fireman's axes with them to enable them to escape in an emergency.

Operational history
Ultimately the Pullman was not accepted for squadron use by the Royal Air Force, nor was it selected for use by any civil operator. The prototype was the sole example of the type constructed or configured.

Variants
Type 26 Pullman
Passenger variant of the Braemar bomber powered by four Liberty L-12 engines, one built and first flown in May 1920, sometimes known as the Pullman 14.
Type 33 Pullman 40
Proposed upscaled 40-passenger variant, it was to be powered from a central engine room, at first with four  Siddeley Tiger engines and later by two  steam turbines. A smaller testbed for the central engine room concept was built as the Tramp.

Operators

Royal Air Force

Specifications

See also

References

Citations

Bibliography
 
 
 

Pullman
1920s British airliners
Four-engined push-pull aircraft
Triplanes
Aircraft first flown in 1920